Saenger or Sänger may refer to:

 Saenger (spacecraft) (or Sänger), spaceplane designed in 1960s-1995 named after Eugen Sänger
 Saenger (crater), lunar crater named after Eugen Sänger

People with the surname
 Carsten Sänger (b. 1962), German former footballer
 Eugen Sänger (1905–1964), Austrian aerospace engineer
 Eugene Saenger (1917–2007), American physician
 Irene Sänger-Bredt (1911–1983) German engineer, mathematician and physicist
 Maria Renata Saenger von Mossau (1680–1749), Bavarian nun executed for heresy and witchcraft
 Max Saenger (1853–1903), German obstetrician and gynecologist
 Oscar Saenger (1868–1929), singing teacher
 Willi Sänger (1894–1944), German Communist and resistance fighter against the Nazis
 Wolfram Saenger (b. 1939), German biochemist and protein crystallographer

See also
 Saenger Theatre (disambiguation) various movie theatres in the Saenger Theatre chain